Football was one of the 154 events at the 1920 Summer Olympics, held in Antwerp, Belgium. It was the fifth time association football was on the Olympic schedule. The tournament expanded to 15 countries, including a non-European nation (Egypt) for the first time.

As these were the first Olympics after World War I, the football teams representing the Central Powers were not invited (Germany, Austria, Hungary, Bulgaria and Turkey). The English Football Association had also withdrawn from FIFA, together with the associations of the other UK Home Nations (Scotland, Ireland and Wales), after their demands that the federations of Germany, Austria and Hungary be expelled from that organisation were rejected. FIFA nevertheless accepted the entry of a team from Great Britain (representing the United Kingdom of Great Britain and Ireland), ruling that countries entering the Olympic Games in other sports should not be excluded from the football tournament.

Britain had won the 1908 and 1912 gold medals, but were beaten by Norway 3-1 in the first round: the Norway national football team thus celebrated one of their iconic victories, alongside the elimination of Nazi Germany at the 1936 Berlin Olympics, the 1993 win over England in World Cup qualifying, and the 2–1 defeat of reigning world champions Brazil at the 1998 World Cup.

Hosts Belgium won the gold medal, with the final being abandoned in the 39th minute with Belgium leading 2-0 after Czechoslovakia - who participated in an international competition for the first time - walked off to protest the officiating: the Czechslovaks were subsequently ejected from the competition.

As a result of Czechoslovakia's ejection and Belgium having received a first-round bye, the beaten quarter-finalists (Italy, Norway, Spain and Sweden) faced each other to determine who would play the Netherlands (who were beaten in their semifinal by Belgium), who were now assured of a medal.

The tournament ended with Belgium winning the gold medal, with Spain winning the silver and the Netherlands winning the bronze.

Venues

Squads

Tournament
15 teams entered the competition, which was organized on a knockout basis, but Switzerland withdrew on the morning before the first round due to internal dissent, meaning their opponent, France, were awarded a first-round 2–0 victory.

As such, 12 teams entered the first round, with the winners joining France and host Belgium in the quarter-finals.

Norway defeated Great Britain in the first round, considered by Elo as one of the greatest football upsets of all time.

Czechoslovakia, participating in their first international tournament, made it to the final, beating Kingdom of SCS (who also played their first ever international match in the competition), Norway, and France, while Belgium, after their first-round bye, beat Spain and the Netherlands to qualify for the final.

The final was abandoned in the 39th minute and Belgium were awarded the gold medal after Czechoslovakia walked off to protest the officiating of the English referee, John Lewis, and his linesmen.

A form of the Bergvall System was used to determine the silver and bronze medals: firstly, the beaten quarter-finalists played off, and Spain emerged triumphant, overcoming Sweden 2-1 and Italy 2-0.

Under the original format, Spain would have played off against the teams beaten in the main tournament by gold medalists Belgium, with the winners of these matches playing off for silver and bronze medals.

However, Czechoslovakia had been ejected from the competition, and Belgium had received a first-round bye: therefore, the third round was scratched, and Spain advanced to the silver and bronze medal match against the Netherlands, who had been beaten by Belgium in their semi-final. Spain won the match 3–1.

Exhibition match
This match was not part of the tournament, but was organized after both teams were eliminated. Some sources erroneously refer to this as an eighth-place match or as part of the silver and bronze medal tournament.

Results

Original bracket

First round

Bye:

Quarter-finals

Semi-finals

Gold medal match

The final was highly controversial, and is the only time as of 2022 that an international final has been abandoned: Belgium were awarded the gold medal after Czechoslovakia walked off the pitch in the 39th minute with Belgium leading 2-0 to protest the officiating after Czechoslovak left-back Karel Steiner was ejected for assaulting Belgian striker Robert Coppée.

The Czechoslovaks were also deeply dissatisfied with the performance of the 65-year-old English referee, John Lewis, as well as that of the English linesmen, Charles Wreford-Brown and Arthur Knight, who had allowed a contentious second Belgian goal by Henri Larnoe in the 30th minute.

Lewis, Wreford-Brown and Knight had officiated the Belgian semi-final victory over the Netherlands two days earlier, a match observed by the Czechoslovaks (it had taken place on the same day and in the same stadium as their own semi-final victory against France).

The Czechoslovaks immediately protested the result of the final, but their protest was dismissed, and the Czechoslovak team was immediately ejected from the competition.

Silver and bronze medal tournament

Repechage bracket
The original format was based on a form of the Bergvall System: after a knockout tournament between the four teams beaten in the quarter-finals, the winner of that tournament would play off against the teams beaten in the main tournament by the gold medalists (Belgium), with the winners of these matches playing off for silver and bronze medals.

However, Czechoslovakia had been ejected from the competition, and Belgium had received a first-round bye: therefore, the third round was scratched, and Spain (the winner of the beaten quarter-finalists tournament) advanced to the silver and bronze medal match against the Netherlands (who had been beaten in the semifinals by gold medalists Belgium).

First round

Second round

Silver and bronze medal match

Final ranking 
Final positions:

Medalists

Goalscorers 

7 goals

  Herbert Carlsson (Sweden)

6 goals

  Antonín Janda (Czechoslovakia)

5 goals

  Ber Groosjohan (Netherlands)

4 goals

  Robert Coppée (Belgium)
  Jan Vanik (Czechoslovakia)
  Félix Sesúmaga (Spain)

3 goals

  Otakar Mazal (Czechoslovakia)
  Jaap Bulder (Netherlands)
  Albin Dahl (Sweden)
  Albert Olsson (Sweden)

2 goals

  Henri Larnoe (Belgium)
  Sayed Abaza (Egypt)
  Jean Boyer (France)
  Guglielmo Brezzi (Italy)
  Einar Gundersen (Norway)

1 goal

  Mathieu Bragard (Belgium)
  Louis Van Hege (Belgium)
  Josef Sedláček (Czechoslovakia)
  Karel Steiner (Czechoslovakia)
  Hassan Allouba (Egypt)
  Hussein Hegazi (Egypt)
  Zaki Osman (Egypt)
  Henri Bard (France)
  Paul Nicolas (France)
  Fred Nicholas (Great Britain)
  Emilio Badini (Italy)
  Adolfo Baloncieri (Italy)
  Enrico Sardi (Italy)
  Jan de Natris (Netherlands)
  Arne Andersen (Norway)
  Einar Wilhelms (Norway)
  Domingo Acedo (Spain)
  Patricio Arabolaza (Spain)
  Mariano Arrate (Spain)
  José María Belauste (Spain)
  Pichichi (Spain)
  Ragnar Wicksell (Sweden)
  Artur Dubravčić (Kingdom of SCS)
  Jovan Ružić (Kingdom of SCS)

Notes

References

 
1920
1920 Summer Olympics events
1920 in association football
1920
Olympics